The 2022 Copa Argentina (officially the Copa Argentina AXION energy 2022 for sponsorship reasons) was the twelfth edition of the Copa Argentina, and the tenth since the relaunch of the tournament in 2011. The competition began on 23 February and ended on 30 October 2022. Boca Juniors were the defending champions but they were eliminated in the semi-finals.

Patronato defeated Talleres (C) by a 1–0 score in the final to win their first title in the tournament. As winners, they qualified for the 2023 Copa Libertadores group stage and earned the right to play against the winners of the 2022 Argentine Primera División in the 2022 Supercopa Argentina.

Teams
Sixty-four teams took part in this competition: All twenty-six teams from the Primera División; fifteen teams of the Primera Nacional; six from the Primera B, four from the Primera C; three from the Primera D and ten teams from Federal A.

First Level

Primera División
All twenty-six teams of the 2021 tournament qualified.

 Aldosivi
 Argentinos Juniors
 Arsenal
 Atlético Tucumán
 Banfield
 Boca Juniors
 Central Córdoba (SdE)
 Colón
 Defensa y Justicia
 Estudiantes (LP)

 Godoy Cruz
 Huracán
 Independiente
 Lanús
 Newell's Old Boys
 Patronato
 Platense
 Racing
 River Plate
 Rosario Central
 San Lorenzo
 Sarmiento (J)
 Talleres (C)
 Unión
 Vélez Sarsfield

Second Level

Primera Nacional
The top seven teams of each zone and the best eighth-placed team of the 2021 tournament qualified.

 Agropecuario Argentino
 Almirante Brown
 Barracas Central
 Belgrano
 Brown
 Deportivo Morón
 Ferro Carril Oeste
 Gimnasia y Esgrima (J)
 Gimnasia y Esgrima (M)
 Güemes (SdE)
 Independiente Rivadavia
 Quilmes
 San Martín (T)
 Tigre
 Tristán Suárez

Third Level

Primera B Metropolitana
The top six teams of the 2021 Primera B tournament qualified.

 Acassuso
  Colegiales
  Flandria
  J. J. de Urquiza
  Los Andes
  Sacachispas

Torneo Federal A
The top five teams of each zone of the 2021 tournament qualified.

 Central Norte (S)
 Chaco For Ever
 Cipolletti
 Deportivo Madryn
 Gimnasia y Tiro
 Olimpo
 Racing (C)
 Sol de Mayo
 Sportivo Las Parejas
 Sportivo Peñarol

Fourth Level

Primera C Metropolitana
The top four teams of the 2021 Primera C tournament qualified.

 Central Córdoba (R)
  Dock Sud
  Ituzaingó
  Laferrere

Fifth Level

Primera D Metropolitana
The top-three teams of 2021 Primera D tournament qualified.

 Liniers
 Puerto Nuevo

Round and draw dates

Final Rounds

Draw
The draw for the Final Rounds was held on 22 December 2021, 15:00 at AFA Futsal Stadium in Ezeiza. The 64 qualified teams were divided in four groups. Teams were seeded by their historical performance and Division. Champions of AFA tournaments playing in Argentine Primera División were allocated to Group A. The matches were drawn from the respective confronts: A vs. C; B vs. D. Some combinations were avoided for security reasons.

Bracket

Upper bracket

Lower bracket

Round of 64
The Round of 64 had 10 qualified teams from the Torneo Federal A, 13 qualified teams from the Metropolitan Zone (6 teams from Primera B Metropolitana; 4 teams from Primera C Metropolitana and 3 teams from Primera D Metropolitana), 15 teams from Primera Nacional and 26 teams from Primera División. The round was played between 23 February and 1 June 2022, in a single knock-out match format. The 32 winning teams advanced to the Round of 32.

Notes

Round of 32
This round had 32 qualified teams from the Round of 64. The round was played between 8 June and 4 August 2022, in a single knock-out match format. The 16 winning teams advanced to the Round of 16.

Round of 16
This round had the 16 qualified teams from the Round of 32. The round was played between August 9 and September 15, in a single knock-out match format. The 8 winning teams advanced to the Quarterfinals.

Quarter-finals
This round had the 8 qualified teams from the Round of 16. The round was played between 27 and 28 September 2022, in a single knock-out match format. The 4 winning teams advanced to the semi-finals.

Semi-finals
This round had the 4 qualified teams from the Quarter-finals. The round was played on 26 October 2022, in a single knock-out match format. The 2 winning teams advanced to the Final.

Final

Top goalscorers

Team of the tournament

References

External links
 Official site 
 Copa Argentina on the Argentine Football Association's website 

2022
Argentina
2021 in Argentine football
2022 in Argentine football